N'Ketia Seedo (born 7 June 2003) is a Dutch track and field athlete who competes in sprint races. She won the Dutch national indoor championships over 60m in 2020, 2022 and 2023.

Career
From Utrecht like Dafne Schippers, Seedo was a precocious talent, racing and beating senior athletes from an early age. She was 15 years old when she finished third at the Dutch indoor national championships 60m race behind Schippers and Jamile Samuel in 2019, before winning the title the following year in 7.24 seconds, the second fastest time by a junior of all time. She won the title again in 2022.
 
She was runner-up in the 100 metres, running 11.40 seconds, at the 2019 European Athletics U20 Championships in Borås, Sweden, losing in a photo finish to Vittoria Fontana who was also clocked at 11.40. She also claimed a silver at that championships in the 4x100m relay.

Seedo won bronze at the 2022 World Athletics U20 Championships in the 100m at the Pascual Guerrero Stadium, in Cali in August 2022, running 11.16, a new national under-20 record, in the heats, before going fractionally better running 11.15 in the final.

She was a member of the Dutch 4x100m relay team that finished fifth at the 2022 European Athletics Championships in August, 2022 in Munich.

Personal life
Born in the Netherlands, Seedo is of Surinamese descent.

References

External links

2003 births
Living people
Dutch female sprinters
21st-century Dutch women
Dutch sportspeople of Surinamese descent